The Baroon Pocket Dam is a rock and earth-fill embankment dam with an un-gated spillway across the Obi Obi Creek, in North Maleny, Sunshine Coast Region, in  South East Queensland, Australia. The main purpose of the dam is for potable water supply. The impounded reservoir is called Lake Baroon.

Just below the dam is Obi Obi Gorge, one of the few remaining places left where the Mary River cod maintains a wild population. After its initial filling, the dam reached its lowest level between December 2002 and February 2003 at 50% capacity.

History 
The name Baroon is the Aboriginal name for the area, which was a meeting place and fighting ground. The name was first recorded by colonists in 1842.

Location and features

Baroon Pocket Dam's primary use is for town water supply for Maroochy and Caloundra. Water is then distributed by UnityWater for a range of purposes. The dam and catchment is managed by Seqwater.

Recreational use and environmental management

Boating
There is a single boat ramp. Camping is not permitted near the lake. There are picnic areas by the lakeside while viewing platforms and a rainforest walking track through Obi Obi Gorge, are located near the spillway. Fossil fuel motors are not allowed on the lake. A council permit, obtainable on site, is required to use an electric outboard motor for the use on dinghies, but not on canoes.

Fishing
Lake Baroon is stocked with bass, Mary River cod, golden perch and silver perch, while eel-tailed catfish and spangled perch are naturally present. A council permit is required to fish in the dam.

Environmental management
Catchment care activities are undertaken by Lake Baroon Catchment Care Group (LBCCG) a community group predominantly funded by SeqWater ($220,000 PA in 2015).  The group coordinates protection and remedial works in the catchment and addresses ways to improve water quality. Since its inception in 1992, LBCCG has developed and monitored over $3.5 million of water quality improvement projects, mainly working with local primary producers.

Walking 
The rugged Sunshine Coast Hinterland Great Walk takes at least four days to complete. It leaves from Baroon Pocket Dam and traverses  through the Blackall Range.  Baroon lookout offering spectacular views of Obi Obi Gorge, Baroon Pocket Dam and its catchment is  along the walk.

See also

List of dams and reservoirs in Australia
List of long-distance hiking tracks in Australia

References

External links

 Baroon Pocket Dam at Seqwater
Baroon Pocket Dam Fishing Information
Pictures  from the National Library of Australia
Lake Baroon Catchment Care Group
Lake Baroon to Kondalilla Falls Walking Track Digitised VHS Tape, State Library of Queensland

Reservoirs in Queensland
Buildings and structures on the Sunshine Coast, Queensland
Dams completed in 1988
Dams in Queensland
Rock-filled dams
Earth-filled dams
Embankment dams
1988 establishments in Australia
Hiking and bushwalking tracks in Queensland